Levi Savage Jr. (March 23, 1820 – December 13, 1910) is a prominent figure in the history of The Church of Jesus Christ of Latter-day Saints (LDS Church). He was one of the earliest LDS Church missionaries to Asia, and was one of the leaders of the Mormon pioneer Willie Handcart Company.

Early life
Savage was the second of 15 children born in Greenfield, Huron County, Ohio to Levi Savage Sr. and Polly Haynes. He grew up on a farm in southern Michigan, where he had some schooling. During his lifetime, Savage was a teamster, soldier, teacher, pioneer, and missionary to India and Burma. He spent the remaining years of his life as a farmer in southern Utah. Savage kept a detailed journal from October 6, 1852 to March 16, 1903.

Pioneer
In the early 1840s, Savage's parents joined The Church of Jesus Christ of Latter-day Saints. The family moved from Michigan to Nauvoo, Illinois, and later migrated as Mormon pioneers to the Salt Lake Valley in 1847.

During the move from Nauvoo to Salt Lake City, Savage enlisted in the U.S. Army as a part of the Mormon Battalion. His enlistment began in July 1846 in Company D of the battalion. The battalion marched 1,400 miles from Council Bluffs, Iowa, to San Diego, California.

Savage's family was a part of the June 18, 1847, Abraham O. Smoot/George B. Wallace wagon train company. His mother, Polly, died on the trek to Utah. Savage learned of his mother's death after he finished his enlistment with the Mormon Battalion. Savage arrived in Salt Lake City via San Diego on October 16, 1847, three weeks after the family.

Savage married Jane Mathers on January 23, 1848. Jane had crossed the plains as the cook for Savage's parents. Their only child, Levi Mathers Savage, was born on January 11, 1851. Jane died on December 29, 1852, leaving Levi Jr. to raise their infant.

On July 10, 1856, Savage was in Iowa City, Iowa, where he joined the ill-fated Willie handcart company that was migrating to Salt Lake City. He was appointed as a sub-captain in the company. At a tense meeting in Florence, Nebraska on August 13, 1856, Savage was asked for his views and told the group that he firmly believed that embarking West so late in the season was dangerous. When overruled Savage reportedly said, "What I have said I know to be true; but seeing you are to go forward, I will go with you, will help all I can, will work with you, will rest with you, and if necessary, will die with you. May God in his mercy bless and preserve us." William Woodward, a captain of the company, later wrote, "Levi Savage, who was censured for his truthful statement at Florence, was I think the best help we had—resolute & determined his whole soul was for the salvation of our company." Over one-fifth of the group died from freezing and starvation before they arrived in Salt Lake City on November 9, 1856.

After returning to Salt Lake City with the ill-fated pioneers, Savage married Ann Brummel Cooper, a member of the Willie handcart company he helped rescue. He later also married two of Ann Brummel Cooper's daughters, Mary Ann Cooper, and Adelaide Cooper, although he only had children with Mary Ann. Savage married Ann Brummel Cooper on October 31, 1858. At the time of the marriage, Ann's daughter Adelaide was 6 years of age (b. Nov. 28, 1851). Mary Ann was 8 (b. Nov. 22, 1849). Savage later married Adelaide when he was 48 and she was 16 (m. October 17, 1868). One week later he married his other step-daughter, Mary Ann (m. October 24, 1868). She was 18. From the marriage with Mary Ann were born three children, William, Riley, and Clara.

Missionary
In October 1852, Savage joined a Mormon mission to Siam. He left his 21-month-old son with his sister, Hannah Maria Savage Eldredge, while he served a four-year mission in the Far East. He left for Siam on October 21, 1852, by traveling through Las Vegas, Nevada, to Los Angeles, California, and then by boat to San Francisco. On January 30, 1853, Savage left San Francisco headed for Siam. On the boat, Levi was struck with smallpox, but survived the outbreak. He arrived in Calcutta, India, on April 25, 1853, and then went on to Rangoon, Burma. He then went to Maulmain, Burma, situated 300 km southeast of Yangon and 70 km south of Thaton, at the mouth of Thanlwinwhere. There he attempted to preach at the British cantonment, but was prevented by the local British commander. Because Siam was experiencing a civil war, Savage never reached there. He served 2½ years in the Far East mission and started home for Utah on October 12, 1855. He traveled from Calcutta, India, to Boston, Massachusetts, by going around the Cape of Good Hope. He arrived in Boston February 28, 1856, and went on to Ohio and Michigan to visit family. In his journal Savage wrote on June 19, 1856, "I have circled the globe." The entire journey took four years.

Settler
Savage worked as a teacher on his return to Utah. Savage served with the Nauvoo Legion during the Utah War, and in 1858 he moved to Lehi, Utah, and worked as a supplier for the U.S. army at Camp Floyd. After seven years, he moved to Toquerville, Utah, where he lived the last 45 years of his life with his three wives, two of whom where also his adopted step-daughters, and three children born to Savage and his eldest step-daughter / wife, Mary Ann. 

One of Savage's last journal entries was February 1903, "This date shows that I have neglected to note daily occurrences in my journal for some time past; however, it is better late than never."

Savage died on December 13, 1910, in Toquerville, Washington County, Utah, and is buried in the cemetery in Toquerville.

Accomplishments

Part of the initial westward movement of the LDS Church to Utah.
A member in one of the 1847 Mormon companies migrating to Utah
One of 500 members of the Mormon Battalion to assist the U.S. Army in the Mexican–American War 1846–48
An early Mormon religious missionary to Burma and India in the Far East
Circumnavigated the world between 1852–1856 at the age of 33
A leader and surviving member of the ill-fated 1856 Willie handcart company moored in winter storms in Wyoming
Writer of a personal journal from 1852–1903 that is quoted and referenced by many for his involvement in the early western Mormon migration and examples of life on the frontier

Portrayals
Savage is the principal character (played by actor Jasen Wade) in the T. C. Christensen film 17 Miracles. This film is based on the actual events surrounding Savage's efforts to aid the Willie Handcart Company in their journey to Salt Lake City in 1856, emphasizing the miracles he and fellow travelers reported during the trek.

See also
Elam Luddington

References

External links
 
 
 
 
 
 

1820 births
1910 deaths
19th-century Mormon missionaries
Latter Day Saints from Michigan
Converts to Mormonism
Members of the Mormon Battalion
Mormon missionaries in Myanmar
American Mormon missionaries in India
Mormon pioneers
People from Greenfield, Ohio
People from Lehi, Utah
American expatriates in Myanmar
Latter Day Saints from Utah